Georgi Nefiodovich Zakharov (24 April 1908 – 6 January 1996) was a Soviet Air Force general.

Biography

Early life
Born to a peasant family, Zakharov graduated from an agricultural institute and went to work in a Sovkhoz, joining the Communist Party in 1929. In 1930 he joined the Red Army, completing pilot training in the 7th Military Flight School at Stalingrad during 1933. Afterwards, he served in the North Caucasus Military District and in the 36th Aviation Brigade of the Kiev Military District.

Interwar years
In late 1936, Zakharov volunteered to assist the Spanish Republic in the Spanish Civil War. He arrived in Cartagena on 20 October 1936, under the alias 'Enrique Lores'. He was soon dispatched to Madrid, that was besieged by the Nationalists. At an air battle on 4 November, while flying an I-15, he shot down two enemy Fiat CR.32's. On 9 November, he intercepted an IMAM Ro.37. On 8 December 1936, he shot down a civilian plane on board of which was the French journalist Louis Delaprée, who was fatally wounded in the incident. 
By the end of 1937, Zakharov was recalled to the Soviet Union. Overall, he claimed six solo and four group kills during his tour in Spain. For his accomplishments, he was awarded the Order of the Red Banner and promoted to captain. After his return, he first served as a test pilot and later as the commander of the 109th Interceptor Flight.

In April 1938, he was assigned to command a detachment of the Soviet Volunteer Group in China, based in Hankou, which was supporting the National Revolutionary Army in the Second Sino-Japanese War. During his service with the Group, which ended in November, he shot down three Japanese Mitsubishi A5M's. While flying a captured Mitsubishi to a Soviet airfield, he crashed in a remote region, but rescued later.

World War II
During 1939, Zakharov graduated from a course in the General Staff Academy and was promoted to Colonel. He was posted as the commander of the Siberian Military District's air component. On 7 May 1940, he was granted the rank of Major General. On November, he left Siberia to command the 43rd Interceptor Division, that was stationed in Minsk, at the Western Special Military District.

On 18 June 1941, Zakharov flew a Polikarpov Po-2 in a special reconnaissance mission over the German lines in the other side of the border. He spotted what he referred to as "an unprecedented German build-up." In an interview, former GRU Colonel Vladimir Kvachkov claimed that Zakharov's report reached the Kremlin and prompted Joseph Stalin to order a full alert on the front, but Marshal Dmitry Pavlov failed to carry out the directive.

On 22 June, when Operation Barbarossa was commenced, Zakharov - flying a Polikarpov I-16 - shot down two Ju 88 over Minsk. In November, he was relieved from his position in the 43rd Brigade and sent to the rear, to head the Trans-Baikal Military Flight School in Ulan-Ude, at Central Asia.

In December 1942 he returned to front duty, and was given command of the 303th Interceptor Division, which was forming in the Kubinka.  He served in that capacity until the end of the war. In April 1943, the 303rd Division was reinforced by the Free French Normandie-Niemen Squadron.

Zakharov's unit participated in the Battle of Kursk and provided air support for the 3rd Belorussian Front during the Battle of Smolensk and the campaign in Belarus.  They later took part in the fighting in Eastern Prussia.

Post-war career
During the Great Patriotic War, Zakhrov had personally flown 153 sorties, participated in 48 air battles and shot down ten enemy aircraft. For his "outstanding command and personal bravery", Major General of the Aviation Zakharov was awarded the title Hero of the Soviet Union and the Order of Lenin. He was later also awarded the Legion d'honneur (Chevalier) and made an honorary citizen of Paris.

After the war, Zakharov served in the Far Eastern Military District and in the military aircraft industry. He retired from active service in 1960.

Awards and decorations
Soviet Union and Russia

jubilee medals

Foreign

References

External links
 Georgi Zakharov on Generals.dk.

1908 births
1996 deaths
Soviet Air Force generals
Soviet major generals
Soviet World War II pilots
Spanish Civil War flying aces
Military personnel of the Second Sino-Japanese War
Chevaliers of the Légion d'honneur
Heroes of the Soviet Union
Recipients of the Order of Lenin
Recipients of the Order of the Red Banner
Recipients of the Order of Kutuzov, 2nd class
Recipients of the Order of Alexander Nevsky
Burials at Kuntsevo Cemetery
Soviet flying aces
Soviet people of the Spanish Civil War
Soviet people of the Second Sino-Japanese War
Recipients of the Order of Zhukov
Military Academy of the General Staff of the Armed Forces of the Soviet Union alumni